Yinchuan is the capital of the Ningxia Hui Autonomous Region, China, and was the capital of the Tangut-led Western Xia dynasty. The city's name literally means "silver river".

Yinchuan is now the permanent site for the China-Arab Expo, a platform for cultural and economic exchanges between China and Arab countries.

The city is also home to Ningxia University, the largest regional comprehensive university under the Project 211 in Ningxia Hui Autonomous Region.

History

Yinchuan was originally a county under the name of Fuping in the 1st century BCE; its name was changed to Huaiyuan in the 6th century CE.

Western Xia 
After the fall of the Tang dynasty in 907, it came under the control of the Tangut-led Western Xia dynasty and was made the capital of the empire, provoking much of the native Han population to emigrate.

Mongol conquest 
After conquering Western Xia in 1227, the Mongols mercilessly pillaged Yinchuan and slaughtered its entire population. The Mongols called the city Iryai.

Ming and Qing dynasties 
Under the Ming (1368–1644) and Qing (1644–1911) dynasties, it was a prefecture of Ningxia. During the Dungan revolt, Dungan forces massacred 100,000 people in Yinchuan.

20th century 
In 1928, when the province of Ningxia was formed from part of Gansu, it became the capital city. In 1954, when Ningxia province was abolished, the city was put in Gansu province; but, with the establishment of the Ningxia Hui autonomous region in 1958, Yinchuan once again became the capital.

Traditionally, Yinchuan was an administrative and commercial center. In the 1950s it had many commercial enterprises, and there were some handicrafts, but no modern industry. The city has since grown considerably. Extensive coal deposits discovered on the eastern bank of the Yellow River, near Shizuishan,  to the north, have made Shizuishan a coal-mining center.

Yinchuan, however, remains largely non-industrial. The immediate plains area, intensively irrigated by a system developed as long ago as the Han (206 BC–AD 220) and Tang (618–907) dynasties, is extremely productive. Yinchuan is the chief agricultural market and distribution center for this area and also deals in animal products from the herds tended by nomads in the surrounding grasslands. It is a market for grain and has flour mills, as well as rice-hulling and oil-extraction plants. The wool produced in the surrounding plains supplies a woolen-textile mill.

Geography

Yinchuan lies in the middle of the Yinchuan or Ningxia Plain. It is sheltered from the deserts of Mongolia by the high ranges of the Helan Mountains to its west. The Yellow River runs through Yinchuan from southwest to northeast. The average elevation of Yinchuan is 1,100 meters (about 3,608 feet). The urban center of Yinchuan lies about halfway between the Yellow River and the edge of Helan Mountains.

Climate
Yinchuan has distinct seasons, with dry, cold winters, late springs and short summers. Diurnal temperature variation tends to be large due to the aridity, which also partly contributes to the sunny climate; with monthly percent possible sunshine ranging from 63 percent in three months to 71 percent in November, the city receives 2,906 hours of bright sunshine annually. There are 158 frost-free days.

Administrative divisions

Demographics

Ethnic groups 
As of 2019, 72.43% of the city's population is Han Chinese, 25.79% is Hui, and 1.78% are other ethnic minorities. Of the city's six county-level divisions, all have a super-majority of Han Chinese people sans the county-level city of Lingwu, which is majority Hui.

Urbanization 
Of the city's population, 79.05% live in urban areas as of 2019. This proportion is highest in Xixia District, where 91.28% of the population lives in urban areas, and is lowest in Lingwu, where 58.22% of the population lives in urban areas.

Economy
The city's gross domestic product per capita was ¥31,436 (US$4,526) in 2008, ranking 197th of 659 Chinese cities. In 2010, Yinchuan was designated as the site for the China-Arab States Cooperation Forum. At the national level, Yinchuan hosts various events such as the China-Arab States Expo, to function as a commercial link between China and Arab States.

Yinchuan classifies itself as a 'smart city', where modern technology is employed such as facial recognition for public transport payments, connected trash bins and digital citizen service centres.

Transportation

 It is served by Yinchuan Hedong International Airport.
Until the 1950s the river, which is navigable downstream as far as Baotou in the Inner Mongolian autonomous region and upstream to Zhongwei and Zhongning, was the chief communication link.
 Highways also link the city to Baotou along the river, to Lanzhou in Gansu province to the southwest, to Wuwei in Gansu to the west, and to Xi'an in Shaanxi province to the southeast.
 Since 1958 the city has been served by Yinchuan railway station on the Baotou–Lanzhou railway and is thus linked to other parts of China by rail. The Taiyuan–Zhongwei–Yinchuan railway opened in 2011.
 China National Highway 211
 G69 Yinchuan–Baise Expressway
 Yinchuan is the first Chinese city to implement a monorail beyond demonstrational use, transporting visitors around the Yinchuan International Flower Expo park.

Culture 
Although most residents are Han Chinese, Yinchuan is a center for the Muslim Hui people, who constitute slightly over a quarter of the population.

Tourism

The city's attractions include the Sand-lake, the Western Xia tombs, and the China Western film Studios.

Sand Lake is a lake in a desert 35 miles north of Yinchuan with birds, reeds, lotus and fish.

The Western Xia Imperial Tombs are 15.5 miles west of Yinchuan on east side of Mt. Helan. Since June 1972, nine imperial tombs and 253 lesser tombs have been unearthed, which are as grand as Ming Tombs in Beijing. With a total area of more than 19.3 square miles, it is unique among royal burials.

China West Film Studio, which has been famed as 'One Superb in China, and Treasure of Ningxia Province', is at the eastern foot of the magnificent Helanshan Mountain, 25 kilometers from the railway station of Yinchuan City, and 48 kilometers from Hedong Airport. It produced The Herdsman, Red Sorghum, Lover's Grief over the Yellow River, New Dragon Gate Inn, Ashes of Time, A Chinese Odyssey, Qiao's Grand Courtyard (TV series) and nearly one hundred other films.

There are two pagodas in Yinchuan that are part of the 'Eight Famous Scenery of Ningxia': one is the Haibao Pagoda in the northern suburb and the other is the Chengtiansi Pagoda in the west.

Parts of the Great Wall are near the city.

Since 2000, Yinchuan has hosted the annual Yinchuan International Car and Motorcycle Tourism Festival, which usually occurs in August.

Colleges and universities
 Ningxia University
 Ningxia Medical University

See also 

 List of twin towns and sister cities in China

References

External links

 Yinchuan Government website
 Weather forecast for Yinchuan in Ningxia (China), 1117 m
 The Yinchuan World Rock Art Museum
 China West Film Studio
 Website specifically about Yinchuan in English 

 
Prefecture-level divisions of Ningxia
Provincial capitals in China